Saab  Sensores e Serviços Brasil is a Brazilian defence electronic manufacturer which has operated since 2020 as a subsidiary company of the Saab AB. Previously established in 2004 as Atmos Sistemas S.A to provide electronic equipment and weather radars, it was bought entirely by the Swedish multinational to manufacture and sell electronic products and avionics for the aerospace industry, and to supply the parts and maintenance needs of the Saab JAS 39 Gripen aircraft of the Brazilian Air Force.

Currently the company provides both technical support, equipment components and electronic and maintenance services to the Brazilian armed forces in the defense field, as well as to civilian customers.

See also
Saab Aeronáutica Montagens
Ares Aeroespacial e Defesa

References

External links

Aerospace companies of Brazil
Avionics companies
Companies based in São Paulo (state)
Defence companies of Brazil
Engineering companies of Brazil
Electronics companies of Brazil
Manufacturing companies of Brazil
Manufacturing companies established in 2020
Technology companies established in 2020
Weapons trade